The Lukolela swamp rat (Congomys lukolelae) is a species of rodent in the family Muridae.
It is found only in Democratic Republic of the Congo.
Its natural habitat is subtropical or tropical moist lowland forest.
It is threatened by habitat loss.

References

Congomys
Mammals described in 1934
Endemic fauna of the Democratic Republic of the Congo
Taxonomy articles created by Polbot
Southern Congolian forest–savanna mosaic
Taxobox binomials not recognized by IUCN